Films For Radio is the sixth studio album by Over the Rhine, released in 2001.

Track listing
All songs written by Karin Bergquist and Linford Detweiler except where indicated

"The World Can Wait" - 5:46
"If Nothing Else" (Detweiler) - 4:53
"Give Me Strength" (Dido Armstrong, Pascal Gabriel, Paul Statham) - 4:13
"Fairpoint Diary" (Detweiler) - 4:35
"I Radio Heaven" (Detweiler) - 4:44
"Little Blue River/In The Garden" (Bergquist) - 8:13
"Goodbye (This Is Not Goodbye) - 5:27
"Whatever You Say" - 3:43
"The Body Is A Stairway Of Skin" - 4:19
"Moth" - 4:37
"When I Go" (Bergquist) - 6:25

Personnel
Karin Bergquist - vocals, piano on #1, acoustic guitar on #11
Linford Detweiler - keyboards, loops, electric & acoustic guitars, bass

Additional personnel
Jack Henderson: Electric Guitar, lap steel
Don Heffington: Drum Kit and Percussion
Byron House: Bass
Norm Johns: Cello
Dave Perkins: E-Bow Guitar
Michael Aukafor: Hammered Dulcimer
Pascal Gabriel: Programming, Keyboards, Loops
Mickey Raphael: Bass Harmonica
David Davidson: Violin
Kristin Wilkinson: Viola
John Catchings: Cello
Terri Templeton: Harmony Vocal
Michael Timmins: Electric Guitar

Appearances

"Give Me Strength" appeared in an episode from Third Watch TV series called "After Hours" (season 2, episode 07).

Over the Rhine (band) albums
2001 albums
Back Porch Records albums